The Black Mountain Rock Art District is an archaeological district located in the Mojave Desert northwest of Barstow, San Bernardino County, California. The district includes a large collection of Native American rock art, including over 12,000 petroglyphs. The largest group of petroglyphs, which includes over 1,000 of the designs, is in Inscription Canyon. The more complex designs include humanoid figures, shields, masks, baskets, deer, bighorn sheep, and other plants and animals. Other petroglyphs represent patterns such as circles, lines, and zigzags. Native Americans made petroglyphs in the area due to its abundance of easily marked lava rock and hard quartz for making etching tools.

The district was added to the National Register of Historic Places on September 12, 2000.

References

Archaeological sites on the National Register of Historic Places in California
Geography of San Bernardino County, California
Petroglyphs in California
Historic districts on the National Register of Historic Places in California
National Register of Historic Places in San Bernardino County, California